Ali Nuhu Mohammed (Born 15 March 1974) is a Nigerian actor and director. He acts in both Hausa and English movies, and he is also known as king of Kannywood or "Sarki Ali" by the media; Kannywood is the Hausa film industry headquartered in Kano, Nigeria. Ali Nuhu has appeared in more than 500 Nollywood and Kannywood films, and earned numerous accolades. Ali Nuhu is widely regarded as one of the greatest and most influential actors of all time in the history of Hausa Cinema, as well as Nigerian Cinema In terms of audience, size, and income, and he has been described as the most successful Hausa film star in the world.

Early life and education 
Ali Nuhu Mohammed was born in Maiduguri, Borno State, in north-eastern Nigeria. His father, Nuhu Poloma, hailed from Balanga local government area of Gombe State and his mother, Fatima Karderam Digema from Bama Local Government Area of Borno State. He grew up in Jos and Kano. After secondary school education, he received a Bachelors of art degree in Geography from the University of Jos. He did his National Service in Ibadan, Oyo State. He later attended University of Southern California for a course in film production and cinematic arts.

Acting career 
Nuhu made his acting debut with the 1999 film Abin sirri ne. He is best known for his role in Sangaya, which became one of the highest-grossing Hausa films at the time. Ali Nuhu starred in several sequel films, including Azal, Jarumin Maza, and Stinda was awarded Best Actor in a supporting role during the African Movie Academy Awards in (2007). In 2019, Nuhu celebrated his 20th anniversary in the entertainment industry. He has appeared in about five hundred movies.

Filmography

Nollywood movies

Awards and nominations 

Nuhu is one of the most decorated actors in the Hausa Cinema, he frequently appears on listings of the most popular, stylish and influential people in Nigeria. He has regularly featured among the top ten of the 100 most influential men in Nigeria. Nuhu has been brand ambassador of various governmental and nongovernmental campaigns including Globacom, OMO, Samsung and others. He received an honorary doctorate from ISM Adonai American University, Benin Republic in 2018.

Ali Nuhu recently became an ambassador for cereal brand, Checkers Custard.

References

External links 

1974 births
Nigerian male film actors
University of Jos alumni
Living people
People from Maiduguri
Most Promising Actor Africa Movie Academy Award winners
Male actors in Hausa cinema
21st-century Nigerian male actors
Kannywood actors
Nigerian male television actors
Nigerian film producers
Nigerian film directors
People from Gombe State
Nigerian film award winners
Nigerian male models
20th-century births